The 2003-04 season was Southampton F.C's 26th consecutive season in the top flight of English football, and it was the club's 119th year in existence. The season started on the 16th of August 2003 and ended on the 15th of May 2004. It was Gordon Stratchan's last season as Southampton's manager. 

The team was eliminated on the third round of the FA Cup, losing 3-0 to Newcastle United, the match was broadcast live by the BBC. They were also eliminated from the Carling cup, losing 1-0 to Bolton Wanderers in the quarter finals due to a goal in extra time.

Season summary
The previous season's FA Cup runners-up failed to make an impact in any of the cup competitions, and their 12th-place finish was a something of a disappointment after the previous season, when Southampton were eighth in the league - their highest ever in the Premiership and their highest in the top flight since 1990. The club was thrown into further turmoil in March, when Gordon Strachan announced his resignation as manager. There was talk that Glenn Hoddle would be returning to the club for a second spell, but the job went to Plymouth Argyle's Paul Sturrock instead.

Final league table

First-team squad
Squad at end of season

Left club during season

Reserve squad
The following players did not appear for the first team this season.

Youth squad

Results

Premier League

FA Cup

League Cup
 Third round: Bristol City 1–3 Southampton; attendance 17,408

UEFA Cup

Statistics

Appearances and goals

|-
! colspan=14 style=background:#dcdcdc; text-align:center| Goalkeepers

|-
! colspan=14 style=background:#dcdcdc; text-align:center| Defenders

|-
! colspan=14 style=background:#dcdcdc; text-align:center| Midfielders

|-
! colspan=14 style=background:#dcdcdc; text-align:center| Forwards

|-
! colspan=14 style=background:#dcdcdc; text-align:center| Players transferred out during the season

|}

References

Southampton F.C. seasons
Southampton